Matt Pivec is an American saxophonist and the director of Jazz Studies at Butler University.

Work
Pivec has been a prolific saxophonist working with several leading musicians and musical groups including Ray Charles, The Temptations, Dave Rivello, Bob Brookmeyer, Peter Erskine, Maria Schneider, Julia Dollison and Melvin Rhyne. He has also toured with Broadway shows like Hairspray and The Producers. Pivec not only plays jazz, he also is a skilled classical musician. He often plays with classical groups like the Rochester Philharmonic Pops Orchestra.

Teaching
Beyond Pivec's collaborations and performances, he also serves as the director of Jazz studies at Butler University. Before becoming director at Butler, Pivec taught at California State University, Stanislaus and Cornell University.

Education
 Doctor of Musical Arts, Eastman School of Music
 Master of Music, Eastman School of Music
 Bachelor of Music Education, University of Wisconsin-Eau Claire

References

Living people
American jazz soprano saxophonists
American jazz tenor saxophonists
American classical saxophonists
University of Wisconsin–Eau Claire alumni
Eastman School of Music alumni
Year of birth missing (living people)
Place of birth missing (living people)
Butler University faculty
California State University, Stanislaus faculty
Cornell University faculty
Jazz musicians from California